Gennadii Shlemovich Rubinstein (rus: Геннадий Шлемович Рубинштейн) was a Russian mathematician. His research focused on mathematical programming and operations research. His name is associated to the Kantorovich–Rubinstein metric which is commonly known as the Wasserstein distance used in optimal transport. 

Gennadii Rubinstein got his doctorate in St. Petersburg State University in 1956, under the supervision of Leonid V. Kantorovich.

Alternate form of the first name: Gennady.

Alternate forms of the last name: Rubinšteĭn, Rubinshtein.

Biography

Selected publications

See also
 List of Russian mathematicians

References

External links
 
 A web page about Gennadii Rubinstein's publications
 Gennadii Shlemovich Rubinstein (obituary)

Russian mathematicians
Academic staff of Novosibirsk State University
1923 births

2004 deaths
Academic staff of Saint Petersburg State University
Saint Petersburg State University alumni
Odesa University alumni